Akhraten (also transliterated Akhratan) was a King of Kush (ca. 350 BCE – 335 BCE).

Akhraten took on at least some titles based on those used by the Egyptian pharaohs.
Horus name: Kanakht Tjema Neditef ("Mighty Bull whose arm is powerful, Protector of his Father") 
Prenomen: Neferibre ("Re is one whose heart is beautiful")  
Nomen: Akhraten

Akhratan may have been a son of Harsiotef and a brother of Nastasen.

Akhratan is known from a cartouche in a chapel and from a black granite statue found in Barkal Temple 500, now located in Boston (23.735). The statue is headless and is missing its feet.

Akhraten may have been succeeded as King of Kush by Nastasen, but some scholars suggest that a king named Amanibakhi may have ruled between Akraten and Nastasen.

References

External links
picture of the statue Boston (23.735)

4th-century BC monarchs of Kush
4th-century BC rulers